J A Jones Hoober Observatory is a privately owned observatory located in South Yorkshire, England near to the villages of Hoober and Wentworth,  North-northwest of Rotherham. The observatory is owned and operated by Mexborough & Swinton Astronomical Society (NPO).

Architecture and design
The observatory consists of a  square building topped by a 5-metre diameter dome. The observatory was built by the members between 1991 and 1993. Originally the dome was only  in diameter. In 1999 a major refurbishment of the observatory was completed including a new 5-metre diameter dome, which was designed & built by the members over the preceding 3–4 years.

A project is currently underway (2018) to extend the observatory by adding a 5-metre square extension (public room). The building is also undergoing extensive refurbishment inside and outside to create a toilet and improve facilities for disabled visitors.

It is projected that the completion will be in time for the 2018 Autumn observing season.

Telescopes

The observatory originally contained the Rayna Telescope, an  newtonian reflector on a fork mount, this was dedicated to long standing member Ray Jackson and his wife Ina. The telescope was built by Peter Drew of the Amateur Astronomy Centre, Todmorden. It was based around an 18-inch f/4.5 parabolic mirror ground by John Owen. Whilst in use the Rayna telescope was the largest telescope open to the public in South Yorkshire.

The observatory currently contains a Takahashi TOA-130F  f/7.6 apochromatic refractor and a Celestron C14-AF XLT  f/11 Schmidt-Cassegrain telescope on a Software Bisque Paramount goto mount. These were purchased to replace the Rayna telescope.

Other telescopes include a  Coronado SolarMax H-alpha telescope on a Vixen GPDX German Equatorial mount with a SkySensor 2000 goto system for Solar Observing.

Public access

The society opens the observatory to the public for evening viewing sessions during the winter months, for Solar observing on Sunday afternoons during the summer and for astronomical events e.g. meteor showers or lunar eclipses.

The observatory, located off Lea Brook Lane in Rotherham, South Yorkshire, is thirty minutes' drive from central Rotherham, is one hours' drive from central Barnsley and one hours' drive from central Doncaster.

Hoober Observatory and light pollution
Whilst the observatory is located in an area of countryside with relatively dark skies compared to Mexborough and Swinton, naked eye limiting magnitudes are rarely below magnitude 4.

Mexborough & Swinton Astronomical Society

The Hoober Observatory is owned and operated by Mexborough & Swinton Astronomical Society, a society and charity based in Swinton, South Yorkshire. Founded on 21 May 1978 as "The Night Sky Astronomy Club" it amalgamated with "The Mexborough Astronomy Club" in late 1978 and became the "Mexborough & Swinton Astronomical Society". It applied for and successfully achieved Charitable Status in 1997.

The society original met in a room at St Johns Church in Swinton. In 1980 Swinton Working Men's Club were approached to allow the society use of an upstairs room, where it still meets on a weekly basis.

Guest lecturers visit the society approximately monthly. Quarterly the society's Observations Officer gives the members an overview of celestial phenomena expected over the next three months and usually issues an observing challenge for the next quarter. Other meetings will find members giving presentations on astronomical subjects of their choice, astronomical quizzes and debates.

The society currently has around 50 members, from throughout South Yorkshire, representing all parts of the community. The society's Honorary President is currently Dr. Allan Chapman of Wadham College, Oxford.

See also
 List of astronomical societies

References

External links

Mexborough & Swinton Astronomical Society website
British Astronomical Association the voice of amateur astronomy in the UK website
The Federation of Astronomical Societies website

Amateur astronomy organizations
Organisations based in South Yorkshire
Astronomical observatories in England
Mexborough
Swinton, South Yorkshire
Buildings and structures in the Metropolitan Borough of Rotherham
1993 establishments in England
1978 establishments in England